Chamta is a village in the Tufanganj I CD block in the Tufanganj subdivision of the Cooch Behar district in West Bengal, India

Geography

Location                                    

Area overview
The map alongside shows the eastern part of the district. In Tufanganj subdivision 6.97% of the population lives in the urban areas and 93.02% lives in the rural areas. In Dinhata subdivision 5.98% of the population lives in the urban areas and 94.02% lives in the urban areas. The entire district forms the flat alluvial flood plains of mighty rivers.

Note: The map alongside presents some of the notable locations in the subdivisions. All places marked in the map are linked in the larger full screen map.

Demographics
As per the 2011 Census of India, Chamta had a total population of 8,190.  There were 4,240 (52%) males and 3,950 (48%) females. There were 885 persons in the age range of 0 to 6 years. The total number of literate people in Chamta was 5,529 (75.69% of the population over 6 years).

Culture
There is a small temple with char-chala tin roof, wherein a triangular stone covered with vermillion is worshipped as Devi Ghurneswari, a form of goddess Kali. A trishula representing Bhairava is also worshipped. The temple draws devotees in large numbers on festive occasions. According to local  legend, a cow/ buffalo used to come regularly and offer milk to the stone-piece lying under a banyan tree. Information about the incident reached Maharaja Harendra Narayan (1780-1839) of Cooch Behar State. He had a temple built, but the present one seems to be a later construction.

References 

Villages in Cooch Behar district